Planeta TV is a Bulgarian music television channel, which launched on 13 November 2001. It is owned by the company "Payner Media" Ltd., which also owns the sister channels Planeta Folk and Planeta HD. The channel is the highest rating among music channels in Bulgaria, according to studies from 2012. Planeta HD is an option for the viewer to watch the channel in high definition. Planeta musical artists have performed around the world and Planeta TV use the highest video production facilities. Planeta Folk consists of traditional Bulgarian folk music.

Tracks 
-MONACO GRAND PRIX-Anelia & Djulia-BRAMMM
-DANIELA PIRYANCOVA & DJORDAN - BOMBA 
-VANYA - DUBAI

Television in Bulgaria
Television channels and stations established in 2001
Television channels in North Macedonia